Cyrtodactylus nepalensis is a bent-toed gecko species first described by Schleich & Kästle in 1998. It is endemic to western Nepal.

References

Cyrtodactylus
Reptiles described in 1998
Reptiles of Nepal